David Gourlay (born 1937) is an Australian gymnast. He competed in eight events at the 1956 Summer Olympics.

References

1937 births
Living people
Australian male artistic gymnasts
Olympic gymnasts of Australia
Gymnasts at the 1956 Summer Olympics
Place of birth missing (living people)